Belize competed at the 2011 Pan American Games in Guadalajara, Mexico from October 14 to 30, 2011. Belize competed in one sport, athletics, with ten athletes.

Athletics

Belize qualified ten athletes.

Men

Women

References

Nations at the 2011 Pan American Games
P
2011